Zillner is a surname. Notable people with the surname include:

 (1926–1983), Austrian politician
Markus Zillner (born 1970), German tennis player
Robert Zillner (born 1985), German footballer

See also
 Ziller (surname)
 Zillmer